Ten Acre Observatory (TAO) features a 20" f 4.5 Starmaster Telescope and a 13" Coulter Optics Telescope as its primary and secondary viewing instruments. It is open to the public by appointment. Services and use of equipment are at no cost. astronomical observatory It is owned and operated by Nick Lazzaro and is used by the Odyssey Astronomy Club as its primary viewing site.  It is located in Tribbey, Oklahoma (USA) and serves the Central Oklahoma Area.

See also
 List of astronomical observatories

References
 

Astronomical observatories in Oklahoma
Public observatories
Buildings and structures in Pottawatomie County, Oklahoma